The Netherlands Football League Championship 1939–1940 was contested by 52 teams participating in five divisions. The national champion would be determined by a play-off featuring the winners of the eastern, northern, southern and two western football divisions of the Netherlands. Feijenoord won this year's championship by beating Blauw-Wit Amsterdam, Heracles, Juliana and GVAV Rapiditas.

This season's championship was not considered official. Owing to the start of World War II, not all teams played an equal number of matches.

New entrants
Eerste Klasse East:
Promoted from 2nd Division: Enschedese Boys
Eerste Klasse North:
Promoted from 2nd Division: WVV Winschoten
Eerste Klasse South:
Promoted from 2nd Division: HVV Helmond & Limburgia
Eerste Klasse West-I:
Moving in from West-II: Ajax, DOS, HVV 't Gooi, HFC Haarlem and VSV
Eerste Klasse West-II:
Moving in from West-I: CVV Mercurius, HBS Craeyenhout, Hermes DVS, Sparta Rotterdam and Xerxes

Divisions

Eerste Klasse East

Eerste Klasse North

Eerste Klasse South

Eerste Klasse West-I

Eerste Klasse West-II

Championship play-off

References
RSSSF Netherlands Football League Championships 1898-1954
RSSSF Eerste Klasse Oost
RSSSF Eerste Klasse Noord
RSSSF Eerste Klasse Zuid
RSSSF Eerste Klasse West

Netherlands Football League Championship seasons
Neth
1939–40 in Dutch football